Valea Babei River is the name of several rivers in Romania:

Valea Babei, a tributary of the Ialomicioara in Dâmbovița County
Valea Babei, a tributary of the Prahova in Prahova County
Valea Babei, a tributary of the Valea Bădenilor in Argeș County